George Augustus Frederick Cowper, 6th Earl Cowper (26 June 1806 – 15 April 1856), styled Viscount Fordwich until 1837, was a British Whig politician. He served briefly as Under-Secretary of State for Foreign Affairs under his uncle Lord Melbourne in 1834.

Background
Cowper was the eldest son of Peter Clavering-Cowper, 5th Earl Cowper, and his wife Emily Lamb, daughter of Peniston Lamb, 1st Viscount Melbourne, sister of Prime Minister William Lamb, 2nd Viscount Melbourne, and a leading figure in Regency society. William Cowper-Temple, 1st Baron Mount Temple, was his younger brother. His mother married as her second husband the future Prime Minister Henry Temple, 3rd Viscount Palmerston, in 1839.

Military career
He was commissioned a cornet in the Royal Horse Guards on 28 April 1827. On 27 February 1830, he purchased a lieutenancy in the regiment. He retired on the half-pay of the New South Wales Veteran Companies in March 1831, but exchanged into a lieutenancy in the 31st Regiment of Foot on 13 February 1835. He retired from the Regular army on 6 March 1835. However, in 1833 he had accepted command of a Troop in the part-time South Hertfordshire Yeomanry Cavalry with the rank of captain, which he held until his resignation in April 1832.

Political career
Cowper entered the House of Commons for Canterbury in the 1830 general election, and served briefly under his uncle Lord Melbourne as Under-Secretary of State for Foreign Affairs between November and December 1834. He lost his seat in Parliament in the 1835 general election. Two years later he succeeded his father in the earldom. Between 1846 and 1856 he served as Lord-Lieutenant of Kent.

Family
Lord Cowper married Lady Anne Florence de Grey (who after her husband's death succeeded as sixth Baroness Lucas of Crudwell), daughter of Thomas de Grey, 2nd Earl de Grey, in 1833. They had two sons and four daughters;

Lady Henrietta Emily Mary Cowper (d.1853)
Francis Thomas de Grey Cowper, 7th Earl Cowper (1834–1905)
The Honourable Henry Frederick Cowper (1836–1887)    
Lady Florence Amabel Cowper (1837–1886), married the Honourable Auberon Herbert in 1871.
Lady Adine Eliza Anne Cowper (1840–1868), married the Honourable Julian Fane in 1866.
Lady Amabel Frederica Henrietta Cowper (1846–1906), married Lord Walter Kerr in 1873.

Lord Cowper died in April 1856, aged 49, and was succeeded in the earldom by his eldest son Francis. Lady Cowper died in 1880.

Arms

References

External links 
 

1806 births
1856 deaths
Earls Cowper
George
Princes of the Holy Roman Empire
East Surrey Regiment officers
Lord-Lieutenants of Kent
Members of the Parliament of the United Kingdom for English constituencies
Royal Horse Guards officers
Hertfordshire Yeomanry officers
UK MPs 1830–1831
UK MPs 1831–1832
UK MPs 1832–1835
UK MPs who inherited peerages
Whig (British political party) MPs